The men's team pursuit event at the 1980 Summer Olympics took place on 25 and 26 July 1980 in Moscow Olympic Velodrome.

Results

Qualifying

Quarter finals
Heat 1

Heat 2

Heat 3

Heat 4

Semi finals
Heat 1

Heat 2

Finals
Bronze medal race

Gold medal race

References

Track cycling at the 1980 Summer Olympics
Cycling at the Summer Olympics – Men's team pursuit